Euphorbia villosa, or hairy spurge, is a species of perennial, herbaceous plant in the family Euphorbiaceae.

Description
It grows to a maximum height of 80 cm. It is named for the hairy undersides of its leaves. The leaves are lightly toothed towards the apex. Chromosomes 2n=20.

It is native to Europe. In the British Isles it has only been identified in England, where it became extinct in 1924.

See also
 List of extinct plants of the British Isles

References

Flora of Europe
villosa